This is a list of Mexican States by date of statehood, that is, the date when each Mexican State was accepted by Congress of the Union as a free and sovereign state of the Mexican Union.

The effective independence of Mexico reached on September 27, 1821, does not meant the independence of the states, because Mexico was the only Latin American country which became independent from Spain as a monarchy. After the fall of the Mexican Empire, the Federal Republic was established on July 12, 1823.

Although 18 of the 19 founder states can be considered official members of the federation since the enactment of the Constitutive Act of the Mexican Federation on January 31, 1824; eleven of them were ratified as states before the enactment and some of the others were included as three states (the internal States of North, Western and Eastern).  Tamaulipas, Tabasco and Chiapas were ratified after the enactment of the act.

All the later admission dates were set by law or decree of congress, except for Chiapas, whose admission was determined by its own people in a referendum.

This list does not account the secession of several states during the establishment of the Centralist Republic and the territorial changes made during the civil and foreign wars.

Notes
1. The order of the states admitted the same day was determined by the day of the installation of its congress.
2. The intendancies were created in 1776 under the Viceroyalty of New Spain. The provinces were created as part of the territorial administration of the Mexican Empire.
3. Yucatán joined to the federation as the Federated Republic of Yucatán.
4. Sonora joined to the federation along with Sinaloa as Estado de Occidente, also recognized as Sonora y Sinaloa.
5. Coahuila joined to the federation along with Texas as Coahuila y Texas.
6. Estado Interno del Norte (north) was formed with Durango, Chihuahua and Nuevo México. Estado Interno de Oriente (eastern) was formed with Coahuila, Nuevo León and Texas. Estado Interno de Occidente (western) was formed with Sonora y Sinaloa. Only the Western State was finally ratified in the Constitution of 1824 and the other two states were divided in different states and federal territories.
7. The Mexican Federation was finally composed of 19 states, the Federal District and the federal territories of Alta California, Baja California, Santa Fe de Nuevo México, Colima and Tlaxcala.
8. Tamaulipas and Tabasco were included in the act as a state, but congress ratified its admission on February 7.

References

See also
Ranked list of Mexican states
States of Mexico
Territorial evolution of Mexico

Date of statehood